Luxor Linens, established in 2005 and headquartered in New Jersey, is an American textile company known for its textiles for hotels and households worldwide. Luxor Linens supplies bed and bath linens made of Egyptian cotton. It also provides services like custom- made orders, monogramming, etc.

The company sells products to both hospitality clients and domestic users and in different events. The company sells their products through their showroom, website and stockist.

A review of Better Business Bureau and other sites, including Google.com, where customers registered complaints about linens' quality and the lack of customer service belie the company's claim of high end service to hotels.

Indeed, customers have registered BBB complaints of stained, items that were  "seconds" (second quality manufacturing defects in items sold as first quality) and fraudulent or doctored  items with tags removed.

History
Jack Nekhala and Mike Nusinkis founded the company in 2005.

Select hotels
The company provides linens to the following hotels worldwide, including:
 The Ritz in London
 The St. Regis Hotel in Atlanta
 Hotel George V in Paris
 The Mandarin Oriental in Boston
 Raffles Hotel in Singapore
 Savoy Hotel in London
 Plaza Hotel in New York City
 Ritz-Carlton in Los Angeles
 All Ritz-Carlton U.S. properties
 All CitizenM properties

See also

References 

Manufacturing companies established in 2005
Luxury brands
American companies established in 2005